Garner Independent School District is a public school district based in the community of Garner, Texas (USA). Garner is the only school district in Parker County that teaches prekindergarten through 8th grade, and students must go to other districts to complete high school. The district has one school – Garner School – and about half of the school's students have transferred to Garner from nearby school districts.

In 2009, the school district was rated "recognized" by the Texas Education Agency.

Students

Academics

Students in Brock typically outperform local region and statewide averages on standardized tests.  In 2015-2016 State of Texas Assessments of Academic Readiness (STAAR) results, 82% of students in Brock ISD met Level II Satisfactory standards, compared with 77% in Region 11 and 75% in the state of Texas.

Demographics
In the 2015-2016 school year, the school district had a total of 178 students, ranging from pre-kindergarten through grade 8. As of the 2015-2016 school year, the ethnic distribution of the school district was 77.5% White, 19.7% Hispanic, 0.6% African American, 0.6% Asian, 0.0% American Indian, 0.0% Pacific Islander, and 1.7% from two or more races. Economically disadvantaged students made up 46.6% of the student body.

References

External links
Garner ISD

School districts in Parker County, Texas